Jonathan Peña (born December 22, 1973) is a Puerto Rican fencer. He competed in the individual épée event at the 2000 Summer Olympics.

References

External links
 

1973 births
Living people
Puerto Rican male fencers
Olympic fencers of Puerto Rico
Fencers at the 2000 Summer Olympics
Pan American Games medalists in fencing
Pan American Games bronze medalists for Puerto Rico
Fencers at the 2003 Pan American Games
Medalists at the 2003 Pan American Games
21st-century Puerto Rican people